The Thomas M. Hess House is a historic house on Partee Drive in Marcella, Arkansas.  It is a -story wood-frame structure, set facing east in a wooded area.  It has a side-gable roof, with a cross-gabled ell extending west from the southern end.  Its front facade is distinguished by a Queen Anne porch, supported by four decoratively-cut columns and a jigsawn balustrade.  The house was built in 1868, and is the oldest known central-hall plan house in Stone County.

The house was listed on the National Register of Historic Places in 1985.

See also
Thomas E. Hess House
National Register of Historic Places listings in Stone County, Arkansas

References

Houses on the National Register of Historic Places in Arkansas
Queen Anne architecture in Arkansas
Houses completed in 1868
Houses in Stone County, Arkansas
National Register of Historic Places in Stone County, Arkansas